Mijiu is a Chinese rice wine made from glutinous rice. It is generally clear in appearance with balanced sweetness and acidity, similar to its Japanese counterpart sake and Korean counterpart cheongju. The alcohol content ranges between 15% and 20%. Rice wine was made around or before 1000 BC in ancient China, and then the practice spread to Japan and other East Asian countries. Since then, it has played an important role in Chinese life. In most Chinese supermarkets there are various kinds of rice wines. It is a traditional beverage to the Chinese and some of the families still follow the custom of making rice wine by themselves. The rice wine is made using glutinous rice, Chinese yeast and water. It is also served as an aperitif and is believed to be beneficial in improving metabolism and skin.

Mijiu is usually drunk warm, like the Japanese sake and Korean cheongju, and is also used in cooking. The cooking mijiu available in Asian grocery stores are generally of a lower quality, and often contain added salt to avoid an alcohol tax. Mijiu is produced in mainland China and Taiwan.

A type of baijiu called rice baijiu is distilled from mijiu.

An unfiltered form of Chinese rice wine containing whole glutinous rice grains of extremely low alcoholic content and often consumed by children is called jiǔniàng or láozāo.

In Taiwan, the Taiwan Tobacco and Liquor Corporation (Monopoly Bureau) is the main manufacturer, branded as Taiwan red label. The alcohol content is 19.5%.

Mijiu is commonly used in cooking dishes such as ginger duck, sesame oil chicken, and shochu chicken.

Usage
The traditional way to use mijiu is to boil three bottles and evaporate the alcohol while cooking with the chicken. It is believed that by using this recipe one can help women's rehabilitation wound. Mijiu is also used in Jiuniang which is a dish that consists of the rice wine, rice particles, and sometimes glutinous rice balls.

Dishes
Mijiu is used in Chinese desserts such as:
 Eggs spoiled in rice wine
 Sweet soup balls with rice wine
 Rice wine with brown sugar

Gallery

See also
Huangjiu, another type of Chinese wine made from rice
Rice baijiu, a distilled alcohol made from rice
Jiuniang
Sake, a Japanese equivalent
Mirin
Cheongju, a Korean equivalent

References

Rice drinks
Chinese alcoholic drinks
Chinese wine
Taiwanese wine
Rice wine
Alcoholic drinks
zh:米酒